Valmala was a comune (municipality) in the Province of Cuneo in the Italian region Piedmont, located about  southwest of Turin and about  northwest of Cuneo.

History 
Valmala was an autonomous comune up to the end of 2018; on January the 1st 2019 it was united to the neighbouring comune of Busca, thus enforcing the results of a referendum held in the summer of 2018.

As a self-standing comune Valmala bordered the following municipalities: Brossasco, Busca, Melle, Roccabruna, Rossana, Venasca, and Villar San Costanzo.

Demographic evolution

References

Cities and towns in Piedmont
Frazioni of the Province of Cuneo